Coles Creek culture is a Late Woodland archaeological culture in the Lower Mississippi valley in the Southeastern Woodlands. It followed the Troyville culture. The period marks a significant change in the cultural history of the area. Population increased dramatically and there is strong evidence of a growing cultural and political complexity, especially by the end of the Coles Creek sequence. Although many of the classic traits of chiefdom societies are not yet manifested, by 1000 CE the formation of simple elite polities had begun. Coles Creek sites are found in Arkansas, Louisiana, and Mississippi. It is considered ancestral to the Plaquemine culture.

Features
The Coles Creek culture is an indigenous development of the Lower Mississippi Valley that took place between the terminal Woodland period and the later Plaquemine culture period. The period is marked by the increased use of flat-topped platform mounds arranged around central plazas, more complex political institutions, and a subsistence strategy still grounded in the Eastern Agricultural Complex and hunting rather than on the maize plant as would happen in the succeeding Plaquemine Mississippian period. The culture was originally defined by the unique decoration on grog-tempered ceramic ware by James A. Ford after his investigations at the Mazique Archeological Site. He had studied both the Mazique and Coles Creek Sites, and almost went with the Mazique culture, but decided on the less historically involved sites name. The Coles Creak area is further subdivided into Coles Creek proper in the northern part of its range throughout the interior Mississippi Valley, and Coastal Coles Creek, being found along the Gulf coast roughly south of the latitude of modern Baton Rouge, Louisiana.

Chronology

Architecture

Although earlier cultures built mounds mainly as a part of mortuary customs, by the Coles Creek period these mounds took on a newer shape and function. Instead of being primarily for burial, mounds were constructed to support temples and other civic structures. Pyramidal mounds with flat tops and ramps were constructed, usually over successive years and with many layers. A temple or other structures, usually of wattle and daub construction, would be built on the summit of the mound.

A typical Coles Creek site plan consisted of at least two, and more commonly three, mounds around a central plaza. This pattern emerged in roughly 800 CE and continued for several hundred years. By late Coles Creek times, the site plans are often enlarged to include up to three more mounds. Sites typical of this period are Mount Nebo, Holly Bluff, Kings Crossing, and Lake Agnes. 

Many Coles Creek mounds were erected over earlier mortuary mounds, leading researchers to speculate that emerging elites were symbolically and physically appropriating dead ancestors to emphasize and project their own authority.

Material culture
Long-distance trade seems to have been negligible at this time, as exotic goods and trade items are rare in Coles Creek sites. There is little evidence of domesticated or cultivated plants until the end of the Coles Creek period. Acorns are a dominant food source, supplemented with persimmons, palmetto, and some starchy seeds such as maygrass. Coles Creek populations may have loosely "managed" certain plant resources in order to promote a better or more consistent food supply. Maize is found in very limited quantities, but by 1000-1200 CE had begun to increase, although nowhere near the levels it would reach in later Mississippian culture times. 

The bow and arrow was introduced in this period, although the atlatl continued to be used. Pottery styles changed during this period, as people began to create more durable wares with more diversified uses. Wet clay was tempered with particles of dry clay to prevent cracking during firing. Most pots were decorated only on the upper half, usually with designs of incised lines or impressed tool marks. Colors ranged from tan, black, brown and gray, although the rare red example is known. Also, the rare effigy pot is found.

Known Coles Creek culture sites

See also
 Plum Bayou culture
 Culture, phase, and chronological table for the Mississippi Valley

References

 Hudson, Charles M., Knights of Spain, Warriors of the Sun: Hernando De Soto and the South's Ancient Chiefdoms,   University of Georgia Press, 1997. 
 R. Barry Lewis and Charles Stout, editors., "Mississippian Towns and Sacred Spaces", University of Alabama Press, 1998.

External links

 Southeastern Prehistory - Late Woodland Period

 
Woodland period
Archaeological cultures of North America
Native American history of Mississippi
Native American history of Louisiana
Native American history of Arkansas
Native American history of Oklahoma
Native American history of Texas
Pyramids in the United States